The Heian Stakes (Japanese 平安ステークス) is a Grade 3 horse race for Thoroughbreds aged four and over, run in May over a distance of 1900 metres on dirt at Kyoto Racecourse.

The Heian Stakes was first run in 1986 and has held Grade 3 status since 1994. The distance was originally 1400 metres before being increased to 1800 metres in 1994 and to 1900 metres in 2013. The race was run at Hanshin Racecourse in 1994.

Winners since 1994

See also
 Horse racing in Japan
 List of Japanese flat horse races

References

Dirt races in Japan